Mohamed Selim may refer to:
 Mohamed Selim (footballer), Egyptian footballer
 Mohamed Selim Soheim, Egyptian boxer
 Mohamed Selim Zaki, Egyptian equestrian